The elm cultivar Ulmus  'Acutifolia' was first described (as U. campestris acutifolia) by Masters  in Hortus Duroverni 66. 1831, and later by Mottet  in Nicholson  & Mottet, Dictionnaire pratique d'horticulture et de jardinage 5: 383, 1898.

Description
The tree has been described as having narrower leaves and branches more pendulous when mature.

Cultivation
No specimens are known to survive. One tree survived in Withdean Park, Brighton for many years, until it was felled in 1978, having succumbed to Dutch Elm Disease.

Synonymy
Ulmus campestris acutifolia: Masters, Hortus Duroverni 66. 1831, and  Mottet in Nicholson & Mottet, Dictionnaire pratique d'horticulture et de jardinage 5: 383, 1898.

References

Ulmus articles missing images
Ulmus
Missing elm cultivars